Stonebreen is a glacier on Edgeøya, Svalbard. The glacier extends into the sea, and defines the eastern point of the island. Former names of the glacier include Disco Hook, Steinnase and Stansforelandshuk.

References

Glaciers of Svalbard
Edgeøya